Major Drilling Group International Inc. is one of the world's largest drilling & mine service companies primarily serving the mining industry.
11
To support its customers’ varied exploration drilling requirements, Major Drilling maintains field operations and offices in Canada, the United States, Mexico, South America, Asia, Africa and Europe. Major Drilling provides all types of drilling services including surface and underground coring, directional, reverse circulation, sonic, geotechnical, environmental, water-well, coal-bed methane, shallow gas, underground percussive/longhole drilling, surface drill and blast, and a variety of mine services.

References

External links
Company Profile

Drilling rig operators
Service companies of Canada
Companies based in Moncton
Companies listed on the Toronto Stock Exchange